Giovanni Innocenti (13 February 1888 – December 1975) was an Italian footballer who played as a goalkeeper. He represented the Italy national football team five times, the first being on 1 May 1913, the occasion of a friendly match against Belgium in a 1–0 home win.

Honours

Player
Pro Vercelli
Italian Football Championship: 1908, 1909, 1910–11, 1911–12, 1912–13

References

1888 births
1975 deaths
Italian footballers
Italy international footballers
Association football goalkeepers
F.C. Pro Vercelli 1892 players